Barry Scott Bjugstad (born June 2, 1961 in Saint Paul, Minnesota and raised in New Brighton, Minnesota) is an American retired professional ice hockey forward who played 317 games in the National Hockey League between 1984 and 1992.

Playing career
He played for the Minnesota North Stars, Pittsburgh Penguins, and Los Angeles Kings. He was also a member of the United States national hockey team in the 1984 Winter Olympics before turning professional.

During high school, Scott Bjugstad lived in New Brighton, MN where he attended Irondale High School and helped lead the Knights hockey team to playoff victories.  After high school, he went on to a successful college career with the University of Minnesota Golden Gophers.

Personal life 
He is the uncle of current Edmonton Oilers center, Nick Bjugstad.

Awards and honors

Career statistics

Regular season and playoffs

International

References

External links

Scott Bjugstad's profile at hockeydraftcentral.com
 Gopher Hockey History Player Info

1961 births
Living people
American men's ice hockey right wingers
Ice hockey people from Saint Paul, Minnesota
Ice hockey players at the 1984 Winter Olympics
Los Angeles Kings players
Minnesota Golden Gophers men's ice hockey players
Minnesota North Stars draft picks
Minnesota North Stars players
Olympic ice hockey players of the United States
Phoenix Roadrunners (IHL) players
Pittsburgh Penguins players
People from New Brighton, Minnesota